Amaga is a genus of land planarians from South America.

Description 
The genus Amaga was erected by Robert E. Ogren and Masaharu Kawakatsu to include Neotropical land planarians with an intra-antral penis papilla, i.e., a small penis papilla at the proximal end of a folded male atrium.

A recent redescription of the type species, Amaga amagensis, revealed that the intra-antral penis papilla is not a permanent structure as previously thought. A new diagnosis of the genus describes it as Geoplaninid land planarians with a large and broad, flat body and a well-developed glandular margin, i.e., several glands discharge along the margins of the body, which can be observed in histological sections. The testes are located at the dorsum, above the parenchymal transverse muscles, while most species in the subfamily Geoplaninae have dorsal testes beneath the parenchymal transverse muscles. The copulatory apparatus lacks a permanent penis and the ovovitelline ducts enter the female atrium at the same time, without joining to form a common duct. The remaining species currently in the genus need a taxonomic re-evaluation and may be transferred to new genera in the future.

Etymology 
The name Amaga comes from the specific epithet, amagensis, of the type-species, originally described as Geoplana amagensis due to its occurrence in the proximities of Amagá, Colombia.

Amaga expatria as an invasive species 

Most species of Amaga have been found in their country of origin in continental South America. However, Amaga expatria has been discovered in the Bermuda and has never been found in South America. In 2020, a study showed that the species was present in many locations in the islands of Guadeloupe and Martinique.  Amaga expatria feeds on earthworms and snails.

Genetics
The complete mitochondrial genome of Amaga expatria has been analysed. It is 14,962 bp in length and contains 12 protein coding genes, two rRNA genes and 22 tRNA genes. The mitogenome was compared with the few available mitogenomes from geoplanids and the most similar was Obama nungara, a species from South America.

Species 
The following species are accepted in the genus Amaga:

Amaga amagensis 
Amaga becki 
Amaga bussoni 
Amaga contamanensis 
Amaga expatria 
Amaga libbieae 
Amaga olivacea 
Amaga ortizi 
Amaga righii

References 

Geoplanidae
Rhabditophora genera